Henryk Stażewski (9 January 1894 – 10 June 1988) was a Polish painter, writer, and visual artist. Stażewski's career spanned seven decades and he is considered a pivotal figure in the history of constructivism and geometric abstraction in Poland. He was one of the few prominent Polish avant-garde artists of the interwar period who had remained active and influential in the second half of the 20th century.     

Stażewski rose to prominence as a co-founder of Blok, Praesens, and a.r. group, three interwar artist collectives which spearheaded the development of Polish Constructivist art. During the 1920s and 1930s, he traveled extensively and became acquainted with other European avant-garde artists, including Kazimir Malevich, El Lissitzky, Theo van Doesburg, Piet Mondrian, and Albert Gleizes. In 1939, Stażewski's career was hindered by the outbreak of World War II and most of his work was destroyed during the Nazi occupation of Poland. After the end of the war in 1945, he returned to painting but was faced with the imposition of Stalinism and Socialist Realism.

Following the cultural and political Thaw of 1956, Stażewski began working on abstract relief compositions, a medium that would preoccupy the artist in the following decades and become his most recognized body of work. First exhibited in 1959, Stażewski's reliefs deployed diverse media and harnessed various non-objective vocabularies inspired by his interwar investigations into geometric abstraction. In 1966, Stażewski initiated a years-long collaboration with the non-commercial gallery space Galeria Foksal in Warsaw, an artist-centered exhibition venue which played a critical role in the development of the Polish post-war avant-garde. Working alongside Tadeusz Kantor, Edward Krasinski, Annette Messager and other contemporary artists who exhibited at Foksal, Stażewski had positioned himself as a leading Polish abstractionist of the 1970s and 1980s. 

Henryk Stażewski's works are included in permanent collections of museums in Europe and the United States. For his contributions to Central and  Eastern European culture, the artist was awarded the 1972 Herder Prize.

Early life and work

Early work and education 
Henryk Stażewski was born in Warsaw on 9 January 1894, then part of the Kingdom of Poland, a semi-autonomous state under the political control of the Russian Empire. Stażewski was one of the four children of Leonard Rafał Stażewski, the owner of a small foundry located on Wspólna Street in central Warsaw, and Michalina (née Skibicka). He enrolled at the Warsaw Academy of Fine Arts in 1913, where he studied under Stanisław Lentz. A surviving series of figurative watercolor paintings from 1915—including nudes, portraits, and landscapes—reveals the influence of Impressionist art in Stażewski's early work. 

Stażewski graduated from the Academy in 1919, a year after Poland had regained its independence. His paintings at the time were inspired by Formizm, a Polish avant-garde group that drew on Cubism, Futurism, and Expressionism and argued against naturalistic representation. In 1921, Stażewski participated in Wystawa Formistów (The Formist Exhibition) at the Society for the Encouragement of Fine Arts in Warsaw and later that year, he showed his work— together with several early compositions by a fellow Polish painter Mieczysław Szczuka—at the Polish Artists' Club in Warsaw. In 1922, Stażewski was included in the Trzecia Wystawa Grupy Formistów F9 (The Third Formist Exhibition F9) in Warsaw and a year later, in the Exhibition of New Art in Vilnius and the International Exhibition of New Art in Łódź.

Polish Constructivism (1924-1930s) 

The Vilnius exhibition in 1923, which included works by avant-garde artists from across Eastern Europe and Russia, has been credited with introducing constructivist tendencies to Polish art. Among the participating artists who would have a significant impact on Stażewski's approach to artistic production was Władysław Strzemiński, who had previously studied at two Moscow Constructivist collectives, INKhUK and Vkhutemas. In Moscow, Strzemiński had investigated various ways in which art could be harnessed to construct a new, socialist society in the aftermath of World War I, recognizing the role of an artist as that of an engineer as well as a scientist aiding in the process of social transformation. 

For Stażewski, the connection between art and science was especially crucial and he argued that "a painting's systematic quality connected it to contemporary civilization in a unilateral action—from science and machines to works of art." Through analyzing "the constituent parts of their painting: space, faktura, line, and color," the Constructivist artists were not completely beholden to the notions of intuition or talent, imbuing the process of art making with a sense of objectivity and collective labor.

Shortly after the Vilnius exhibition, together with Strzemiński and his wife Katarzyna Kobro among other artists, Stażewski co-founded Blok, or the Blok Group of Cubists Constructivists, and Suprematists (Grupa Kubistow, Konstruktywistow i Suprematystow Blok) (1924–1926), the first Polish Constructivist collective focused on gathering like-minded artists, designers, architects, and theorists to help improve the lives of ordinary citizens. Inspired by leftist politics, Polish Constructivists had sought to use abstraction—applied to functional architecture, furniture design, typography or graphic design—as a radical tool to foster social and political transformation, thus bringing art into the service of the people. In a text from 1924, Stażewski emphasized the important role that abstraction plays in constructing a new, modern society:
In 1926, Blok dissolved due to internal conflicts and was followed by Praesens (1926–1929), and later a.r. group (1929–1936), all three of which were critical in defining Polish Constructivism as a movement. As a member of these avant-garde groups, Stażewski made contributions to Polish Constructivism through typography, poster design, theoretical writings (including publications for the Blok magazine published between 1923 and 1926), as well as interior design and furniture design. At Blok, Stażewski had also collaborated with Henryk Berlewi and Szczuka who were considered leading figures in Polish avant-garde typography. Though predominantly idealistic and limited in their actual impact on the Polish post-World War I society, the Constructivists managed to complete some important architectural projects (Praesens, for instance, participated in the design of apartment buildings for the Warsaw Housing Cooperative in the Rakowiec district) and induced the Polish avant-garde, up until then largely autonomous, with a sense of social commitment.

In March 1927, Stażewski was among several Polish artists hosting Kazimir Malevich during his trip to Warsaw. He helped organize Malevich's exhibition at Hotel Polonia Palace—first outside of the Soviet Union—and invited the artist to visit his studio. Malevich's Suprematism had served as a crucial point of reference for Russian Constructivists and avant-garde artists across Central and Eastern Europe; he is said to have made a lasting impact on Stażewski in particular, who examined some of the key ideas of Suprematism regarding the autonomy of art and the superiority of non-objective visual forms in regard to his own work.

Relationships with European Avant-gardes 

While working with Constructivist groups in his home country, Stażewski traveled frequently and participated in several international exhibitions throughout the 1920s, including the 1926 Paris Exhibition of Theatrical Art and the Machine Age Exposition in New York in 1927. He had also developed and cultivated relationships with representatives of Western European avant-garde groups, including Theo van Doesburg and Piet Mondrian of the Dutch De Stijl movement, as well as the French painter Albert Gleizes. The influence of De Stijl can be found in Stażewski's work from around that time, including oil paintings titled Kompozycja (c. 1929-1930) and Kompozycja Fakturowa (Textural Composition) from 1931, which rely on interlocking vertical and horizontal shapes to form a geometrical grid. 

In 1929, Stażewski became a member of the Cercle et Carré and, in 1931, joined Abstraction-Création, two Paris-based groups gathering international abstract painters. Also in 1931, Stażewski, as member of the a.r. group, co-organized the International Collection of Modern Art in Muzeum Sztuki in Łódź. Spearheaded by Strzemiński, the collection included works by key modern artists from across Europe, including Fernand Léger, Max Ernst, Hans Arp and Kurt Schwitters, and opened to the public on 15 February 1931. 

By the second half of the 1930s, Stażewski had returned to representational art while still exhibiting abstract paintings and graphic design in Poland and Europe. He also supported himself financially through portrait commissions. During Hitler's invasion of Poland in early September 1939, the building which housed Stażewski's studio in Warsaw was bombed, destroying most of his work. Stażewski remained in Poland and lived under Nazi occupation between 1939 and 1945, first in Szczekociny (1943) and later in Radość (1945), having mostly abandoned artistic production during that period, except for several caricatures and landscapes, virtually none of which have survived till this day.

Post-war career

Stalinist Poland (1948–1956) 

In 1945, shortly after the war had ended, Stażewski moved to Warsaw and was hired as the head of the art studio at the Military Geographical Institute. He occupied an apartment on Piękna Street together with artists Jan Rogoyski and Maria Ewa Łunkiewicz-Rogoyska, a space that would become a nexus of Warsaw avant-garde artists and intellectuals in the following years. During the early post-war era, he returned to painting and experimented with various modernist styles, including biomorphic abstraction and semi-figurative compositions inspired by Surrealism (evident, for instance, in the 1947 painting titled Escape).

In 1947, as a result of rigged legislative election, the hardline Stalinist Bolesław Bierut became President of Poland. Following the Unification Congress of the Polish Workers' Party and Polish Socialist Party in December 1948, Poland was turned into a satellite state of the Soviet Union. Earlier that year, Stażewski had co-designed decorative glass panels for the large-scale Wystawa Ziemi Odzyskanych (Exhibition of Recovered Territories) held in the city of Wrocław between July and October 1948. A sweeping state-organized display devoted to Ziemie Odzyskane (Recovered Territories), the exhibition celebrated large areas of western and northern Poland that had been annexed from Germany in the aftermath of World War II and which had become a centerpiece of the early Stalinist propaganda. Although fired from his position at the Institute in 1949, Stażewski was able to carefully navigate the new socio-political ecosystem, avoiding the fate of his fellow avant-garde collaborators, Strzemiński and Kobro, who had been accused of reactionary cultural activities and whose careers had been effectively destroyed by the emergent Stalinist regime.

Soon, Stażewski turned to Socialist Realism—a figurative art doctrine reliant on idealized depictions of life under socialism—that had been officially imposed by the communist regime in 1949. However, he had never fully committed to the naturalistic academicism expected of Soviet and Soviet-aligned artists. In 1950, Stażewski was named a member of the selection committee for the I Ogólnopolska wystawa plastyki (First Nationwide Display of Plastic Arts), the inaugural exhibition of Polish Socialist Realism organized at the National Museum in Warsaw. Between 1950 and 1952, he completed multiple figurative paintings to align himself with the demands of the state. Among Stażewski's surviving Socialist Realist works is an oil painting titled Na scalonych ziemiach (On the Recovered Territories) completed in 1950, in which a tractor driver is seen traversing the eponymous reclaimed land.

The death of Stalin in 1953 and the subsequent political Thaw of 1956 precipitated the return of avant-garde art. While Poland had become one of the first countries among the Soviet satellite states to embrace the Thaw, the cultural shift was a gradual process. Toward the end of the Stalinist regime, he and Łunkiewicz-Rogoyska were commissioned to paint a worker-themed realistic mural at the new headquarters of state-controlled Metalexport company in Warsaw, which opened in 1954. In recognition for his artistic contributions to the Polish People's Republic, Stażewski received a Gold Cross of Merit in 1955.

Reliefs (1956-1970s) 
In 1955, Stażewski became a member of Klub Krzywego Koła (Crooked Circle Club) in Warsaw, an independent cultural initiative for avant-garde artists, writers, and intellectuals. In 1956, Bierut died and Nikita Khrushchev, the First Secretary of the Communist Party of the Soviet Union and the de facto leader of the USSR who had succeeded Stalin, delivered a speech titled "On the Cult of Personality and Its Consequences" which disavowed Stalinism and officially ushered in the political Thaw. That year, Stażewski joined the newly opened gallery space of the Crooked Circle Club where Jerzy Nowosielski, Alina Szapocznikow, Urszula Broll, Stefan Gierowski and other contemporary painters would also exhibit their work.
In around 1956, Stażewski began exploring the relief form as his medium. Using a variety of unorthodox materials that included plywood, plexiglass, cardboard, Masonite board and copper, the artist deployed diverse non-representational forms to construct three-dimensional reliefs on a horizontal pictorial surface. Stażewski's reliefs broke away from the traditional pictorial flatness and underscored the artist's interest in the tactile qualities of used materials, forging a new theoretical space with which to articulate color. Moreover, the artist's emphasis on tactility and materiality recalls the Russian Constructivist engagement with faktura, an intention to accentuate the work's physical qualities as a way to challenge traditional illusionism in painting.

In 1959, Stażewski exhibited the reliefs for the first time during a solo show at Kordegarda Gallery in Warsaw. The exhibition space consisted of large, protruding panels designed by the Polish scenographer and architect Stanisław Zamecznik, contributing to what Stażewski called "relative movement," or an intention to increase the physical depth of the relief space to create a more immersive environment for the viewer. Well received by contemporary critics, the Kordegarda show helped to re-position Stażewski as a leading figure in the Polish contemporary art scene. According to art historian Marek Bartelik, Henryk Stażewski's commitment to abstraction in the post-war era speaks "to the persistence of the utopian belief in the transcendent power of abstraction: as a form of absolute universal expression." The artist's inspirations during that time were manifold and art historian  notes that Stażewski "did not succumb to any stylistic categories." At the same time, scholar Christina Lodder points to the continued relevance of Russian avant-garde art, including that of Malevich, whose Suprematist Composition: Aeroplane Flying from 1915 Stażewski had reproduced in 1962.

Between 1960 and 1962, Stażewski held three exhibitions at the Crooked Circle Gallery in Warsaw and continued to showcase his relief work, including a series of White Reliefs made in 1961. In August 1961, several of Stażewski's reliefs were included in Fifteen Polish Painters, a major exhibition of Polish contemporary art at the Museum of Modern Art in New York, alongside works by Wojciech Fangor, Tadeusz Kantor, and Jan Lebenstein, among others. Focused almost exclusively on non-representational art and organized by a major U.S. institution, the show championed abstraction as a symbolic manifestation of Poland's cultural and political freedom during the Cold War era. Also in 1961, art dealers Madeleine Chalette-Lejwa and Arthur Lejwa, the founders of Galerie Chalette in New York, featured Stażewski's work in a small group exhibition, offering him an early exposure to the American market. 

By the mid-1960s, Stażewski had begun using aluminum and copper for his relief work, shunning painted material in favor of the intrinsic color properties of metal. According to art historians Maja and Reuben Fawkes, the reliefs made of metal simulate "the effect of depth by rhythmically layering shapes and optical effects on the surface, exchanging visual determinism for the randomness of reflected light." In 1964, Kazimir Karpuszko, a Polish ex-pat art dealer, organized a show of Stażewski's work at Chicago's Contemporary Art Gallery, the artist's first solo exhibition in the United States and an opportunity to introduce his reliefs to the wider American public. In subsequent years, Stażewski's work was also shown at Marlborough-Gerson Gallery and Sidney Janis Gallery in New York. In Poland, several of Stażewski's works, including a large-scale geometrical metal sculpture modeled after one his abstract reliefs, were included in the First Biennial of Spatial Forms in Elbląg in 1965. By 1968, Stażewski had returned to polychromatic relief compositions, often made with wood on Masonite board and painted over with acrylic, frequently juxtaposing simple geometrical figures in contrasting colors to achieve a sense of visually dynamic arrangement. Referring to his sustained engagement with color during a 1968 interview, the artist said: "I gradually move from cold to warm colors according to their wavelengths, from pure to grey, from light to dark, using vertical and horizontal combinations. This gives me an infinite number of variants."

Later career (1966–1988) 
In 1966, Stażewski was one of the artists representing Poland at the XXXIII Venice Biennale, where his relief works received an honorable mention. Throughout the 1960s, Stażewski collaborated regularly with contemporary galleries in and outside of Poland. Key among them was his long-standing collaboration with Foksal Gallery, which he co-founded in 1966, a non-commercial art space in Warsaw that would play a key role in the development of Polish post-war avant-garde. Unlike traditional exhibition venues, Foksal revolved around robust collaboration between participating artists and was supposed to present displays that "problematized the artistic process itself" while keeping an "apparent distance from governmental endeavors to instrumentalize art," even though the gallery was publicly funded. Stażewski thus had an opportunity to exhibit reliefs in a more experimental and experiential space.

At Foksal, Stażewski facilitated connections with international artists. Throughout the 1970s, he worked alongside Włodzimierz Borowski, Tadeusz Kantor, Allan Kaprow (exhibited at Foksal in 1976), Christian Boltanski (1978), and Anette Messager (1978), among others. Outside of Foksal, he acquainted the French conceptual artist and art theorist Daniel Buren. Stażewski and Buren would later collaborate on a project at Galerie 1–36, an experimental gallery space active in Paris between 1972 and 1976. He also developed a close artistic relationship with Edward Krasiński. He and Krasiński shared a studio-apartment at Aleja Solidarnosci in Warsaw from 1970 until Stażewski's death in 1988.
 
Stażewski experimented with color and geometry in diverse visual and aesthetic registers until late in his career. In 1970, he participated in the art symposium Wrocław 70 where he showcased Infinite Vertical Composition (9 Rays of Light in the Sky), an artwork made of colorful beams of light projected onto the night sky that released color from its previous pictorial confines. In 1972, the Dallas Museum of Art included Stażewski in Geometric Abstraction, 1916–1942, a survey show of geometric abstract art in the first four decades of the 20th century. In 1976, he was featured in Constructivism in Poland, 1923–1936: Blok, Praesens, a.r., an exhibition devoted to the history of Polish Constructivism organized at the Museum of Modern Art in New York, which traveled the same year to the Detroit Institute of Arts, the Albright-Knox Gallery in Buffalo, and the Art Institute of Chicago. That year, the artist was awarded the Herder Prize for his contributions to the visual culture of Central and Eastern Europe. 

Later in the 1970s, Stażewski began exploring the visual properties of line. His paintings and drawings from that period show an investigation into the possibilities afforded by line, including the monochromatic grid. Geometry remained a critical reference point for the artist and he considered it an "innate measure in the eye of every man, allowing him to grasp relations and proportions." Over the next decade, Stażewski also continued to revitalize some of the visual forms present in his early tactile reliefs by moving back them onto a flat painterly surface. While his later compositions had become more intuitive, standing in contrast to the more scientifically determined compositional methods, the artist remained committed to examining the pictorial properties of color. Scholar Janina Ladnowska described Stażewski's planes of color as "flat, strong, homogeneous, clean, sometimes shining" and suggested that these polychromatic compositions made late in the artist's career cast doubt on the "rational" structures of his earlier work. He continued to exhibit domestically and abroad throughout the 1980s, having participated in solo and group shows at Staatliche Kunstsammlungen in Dresden, Monumentum Fine Arts in Minneapolis, as well as Centre Pompidou and Galerie Denise René in Paris.

Henryk Stażewski died in Warsaw on 10 June 1988 aged 94. His funeral was held on 17 June and the artist was interred at the Powązki Military Cemetery in Warsaw.

Legacy 
Owing to his long-standing career, Stażewski has had an important influence on the history of Polish modern and contemporary art. He has been called a "pioneer the classical avant-garde of the 20s and 30s" and described as "one of the most important" Polish artists to link the "pre-war and post-war Avant-garde tendencies." Stażewski's work is said to have "paved the way for the revitalization of geometric art" and has served as a source of inspiration for the younger generation of Polish postwar artists. Magdalena Abakanowicz, for instance, closely modeled her early textile works on Stażewski's reliefs and relied on the artist's use of "contrast as an organising principle".

In 1990, an exhibition of Henryk Stażewski's abstract compositions at Centro Atlántico de Arte Moderno in Las Palmas recognized him as the Polish pioneer of concrete art, originally an offshoot of Neoplasticism initiated in 1930 by Theo van Doesburg which later gained popularity in Latin America during the 1940s and 1950s. In 1994, to commemorate the 100th anniversary of Stażewski's birth, Muzeum Sztuki in Łódź organized a major posthumous retrospective devoted to his oeuvre. In his review of the exhibition, critic and art historian Marek Bartelik wrote that for the numerous Polish admirers of the artist "his uncompromising stance serves today as a confirmation of their belief in the infinite depth and superiority of geometric abstraction." 

In 2009, Daniel Buren, with whom Stażewski had collaborated during the 1970s, designed a dedicated temporary display space for several of Stażewski's reliefs at the Muzeum Sztuki titled Daniel Buren / Hommage à Henryk Stazewski. Cabane éclatée avec tissu blanc et noir, travail situé, 1985–2009 and installed as an homage to the late artist. More recently, Stażewski's Colored Relief (1963) was featured in Transmissions: Art in Eastern Europe and Latin America, 1960–1980, a comprehensive 2015 survey exhibition organized at the Museum of Modern Art in New York that examined parallels between art in Eastern Europe and Latin America during the 1960s and 1970s.

Collections 

Stażewski's works are included in permanent collections of museums in Europe and the United States, including the Museum of Modern Art in New York, the Brooklyn Museum in New York, Buffalo AKG Art Museum (formerly known as Albright–Knox Art Gallery), the Museum of Contemporary Art in Chicago, the Museum of Contemporary Art in Los Angeles, Zachęta, the National Gallery of Art in Warsaw, the Centre Pompidou in Paris, and the Tate Modern in London.

Several of Stażewski's geometric abstract paintings from the interwar period are on permanent display at the Neoplastic Room (Sala Neoplastyczna) at Muzeum Sztuki in Łódź. The design of the room, originally conceived by Władysław Strzemiński in 1948, was inspired by interactions of primary colors typical of De Stijl movement, complemented by black, white, and grey. The display was shut down by the communist regime in 1950 and reconstructed in 1960 based on the surviving photographs. The exhibition space was expanded in 2010 to include a wider display of interwar and contemporary art from the museum's collection.

Art market 
In November 2022, Henryk Stażewski's Relief No. 8 from 1969 was sold for €1.03 million at Sotheby's in Milan, among the highest prices paid at auction for a 20th-century Polish work of art.

Notes

Citations

Further reading 

 Constructivism in Poland, 1923 to 1936 (exh. cat., ed. H. Gresty and J. Lewinson; Cambridge, Kettle’s Yard; Łódź, Mus. A.; 1984)
 Mansbach, Steven. Modern Art in Eastern Europe: From the Baltic to the Balkans, ca. 1890–1939 (Cambridge, 1999)
 Central European Avant-gardes: Exchange and Transformation, 1910–1930 (exh. cat., ed. T. Benson; Los Angeles, Los Angeles County Museum of Art, 2002)
 Piotrowski, Piotr. In the Shadow if Yalta: Art and the Avant-Garde in Eastern Europe, 1945–1989 (London, 2009)
 Henryk Stażewski: Dzieła z lat 1923–1980 (exh. cat., ed. W. Smużny and J. Ładnowska; Toruń, Office A. Exh., 1980)
 Turowski, Andrzej. Konstruktywizm polski: Próba rekonstrukcji nurtu 1921–1934 (Wrocław, 1981)
 Kowalska, Bozena. Henryk Stażewski (Warsaw, 1985)

External links

Henryk Stażewski at Culture.pl
Henryk Stażewski in Museum of Modern Art, Warsaw

20th-century Polish painters
20th-century Polish male artists
1894 births
1988 deaths
Herder Prize recipients
Polish male painters

Abstract artists
Constructivism (art)
Eastern European culture